Kevin Marques Moo (born 1974), better known by his stage name Daddy Kev, is an American DJ, Grammy Award-winning audio engineer, record producer and executive from Los Angeles, California. He is the owner of Alpha Pup Records and the founder of Low End Theory. As an audio engineer, Daddy Kev has mixed and mastered albums by Flying Lotus, Thundercat, Kamasi Washington, and Leon Bridges.

Early life
Daddy Kev was born and raised in the Harbor City neighborhood of Los Angeles. As a child, he played piano and trumpet. At the age of 13, he started playing turntables. He graduated from Narbonne High School. He earned a Bachelor of Arts in philosophy from University of California, San Diego.

Career
In 2001, Daddy Kev released an EP, Lost Angels, on Celestial Recordings. It featured guest appearances from the rappers Myka 9, P.E.A.C.E., Busdriver, Awol One, and Circus. In that year, he also released Souldoubt, a collaborative album with Awol One, on Meanstreet Records. Another collaborative album with Awol One, titled Slanguage, was released on Mush Records in 2003. 2004 brought Busdriver's Cosmic Cleavage, which was produced entirely by Daddy Kev and released on Big Dada.

In 2006, he founded the weekly Low End Theory club night at the Airliner in the Lincoln Heights neighborhood of Los Angeles.

In 2012, he founded the studio Cosmic Zoo in Los Angeles along with the rapper Nocando.

At the 58th Annual Grammy Awards held in 2016, he was nominated for the Best Dance Recording award for mixing the Flying Lotus song "Never Catch Me" featuring Kendrick Lamar.

At the 63rd Annual Grammy Awards held in 2021, he won the Best Progressive R&B Album award for mixing the Thundercat album It Is What It Is.

In 2022, he self-published a book on audio engineering entitled Audio Dynamics: Compression Techniques for Modern Mixing and Mastering.

At the 65th Annual Grammy Awards held in 2023, he was nominated for the Best Historical Album award for mastering the Freestyle Fellowship album To Whom It May Concern....

Style and influences
Pitchfork called Daddy Kev "one of the Los Angeles underground's most visionary producers", while Fact called him "one of underground hip-hop's most respected engineers".

Discography

Studio albums
 Souldoubt (2001) 
 Number 3 on the Phone (2002) 
 Slanguage (2003) 
 Reefer (2008)

EPs
 Lost Angels (2001)
 Sound Advice (2003) 
 Killafornia (2005)

Singles
 "Rhythm" (2001)

Productions
 Phoenix Orion – "Scanners", "Millennium Fever", "Dead Men Don't Download", and "Blade Runner" from Zimulated Experiencez (1998)
 Supernatural – "Seven Minutes of Understanding" (1999)
 Alien Nation – "Unicorn" (1999)
 Sole – "Famous Last Words" from Bottle of Humans (2000)
 Naptron – "Marvin Meets Seymour Frye Pt. I" (2000)
 Mikah 9 – "First Things Last" from Timetable (2001)
 Abstract Rude – "Frisbee" from P.A.I.N.T. (2001)
 Busdriver – "Mindcrossings", "Suing Sony", and "Single Cell Ego" from Temporary Forever (2002)
 Existereo – "Four Way Window Pain" from Dirty Deeds & Dead Flowers (2003)
 Abstract Rude & Tribe Unique – "Flow and Tell" from Showtyme (2003)
 Neila – "Vertical Trees with Eternal Leaves" from Vertical Trees with Eternal Leaves (2003)
 Busdriver and Radioinactive – "Winthorp & Winthorp" (2003)
 Existereo – "Same Breath" from Crush Groove (2004)
 The Shape Shifters – "Rockin' These Mics", "Kreye Inn", and "Futuristic" from Was Here (2004)
 Busdriver – Cosmic Cleavage (2004)
 Sage Francis – "Dance Monkey" from A Healthy Distrust (2005)
 Awol One – "Everything's Perfect" from The War of Art (2006)
 Subtitle – "Restructure/Reroute" from Terrain to Roam (2006)
 Acid Reign – "Too Kool for Skool" and "Here Comes Trouble" from Time & Change (2008)
 The Grouch – "Shero" from Show You the World (2008)

Select works mastered by Daddy Kev

2000s

2002 - Shockadoom - Freestyle Fellowship
2002 - Temporary Forever - Busdriver
2003 - Sound Advice - The Grouch
2004 - Bangzilla - Mix Master Mike
2004 - Cosmic Cleavage - Busdriver
2006 - Throw A Fit EP - Daedelus
2007 - Reset - Flying Lotus
2008 - Early Works For Me If It Works For You II - Dntel
2008 - Los Angeles - Flying Lotus
2008 - L.A. EP 1 X 3 - Flying Lotus
2008 - Ken Can Cook - Kenny Segal
2008 - Rap Beats Vol. 1 - Samiyam
2008 - Live at Low End Theory - Daedelus
2008 - Reefer - Reefer
2009 - Drift - Nosaj Thing
2009 - Brotha From Anotha Planet - Ras G

2010s

2010 - Cosmogramma - Flying Lotus
2010 - Machines Hate Me - Dibiase
2010 - Ardour - Teebs
2010 - Midnight Menu - TOKiMONSTA
2010 - Shlomoshun Deluxe - Shlohmo
2010 - Cerulean - Baths
2010 - Camping - Shlohmo
2010 - After Parties 1 - Dntel
2010 - After Parties 2 - Dntel
2011 - The Golden Age of Apocalypse - Thundercat
2011 - Endless Planets - Austin Peralta
2011 - Bowser - Jonwayne
2011 - Collections 01 - Teebs
2011 - Creature Dreams - TOKiMONSTA
2011 - Complex Housing - Salva
2011 - Stade 2 - Mr. Oizo
2011 - Outmind - Matthewdavid
2011 - Manifestations - Mono/Poly
2011 - Life is Full of Possibilites (Deluxe Edition) - Dntel
2011 - Ghost People - Martyn
2011 - Sam Baker's Album - Samiyam
2012 - Until the Quiet Comes - Flying Lotus
2012 - The Death of Andrew - Jonwayne
2012 - When You're Gone - Lapalux
2012 - The Narcissist II - Dean Blunt
2013 - Indigoism - The Underachievers
2013 - Needs - Giraffage
2013 - Stade 3 - Mr. Oizo
2013 - Apocalypse - Thundercat
2013 - Kenny Dennis LP - Serengeti
2013 - Obsidian - Baths
2013 - Back on the Planet - Ras G
2013 - Rap Album One - Jonwayne
2014 - You're Dead! - Flying Lotus
2014 - In Return - ODESZA
2014 - A Toothpaste Suburb - Milo
2014 - Estara - Teebs
2014 - Desiderium - TOKiMONSTA
2014 - The Church - Mr. Oizo
2014 - Ocean Death - Baths
2014 - Vivid Green - Nobody
2015 - A Toothpaste Suburb - Milo
2015 - The Beyond / Where the Giants Roam - Thundercat
2015 - The Epic - Kamasi Washington
2015 - Jonwayne Is Retired EP - Jonwayne
2015 - The Courage of Present Times - Sonnymoon
2015 - So the Flies Don't Come - Milo
2015 - Hella Personal Film Festival - Open Mike Eagle
2015 - Mù Chè Shān Chū - Howie Lee
2015 - Plain Speaking - Scallops Hotel
2015 - Intermission - Shigeto
2015 - In the Moment E & F Sides - Makaya McCraven
2015 - Mars Is A Very Bad Place For Love - The Breathing Effect
2015 - Sold Out - DJ Paypal
2015 - Lil Me - Wiki
2015 - Chinese Nü Yr - Iglooghost
2015 - Thumbs - Busdriver
2015 - Evermore: The Art of Duality - The Underachievers
2015 - Shades - Alix Perez & EPROM
2016 - All Wet - Mr. Oizo
2016 - Callus - Gonjasufi
2016 - Labyrinths - Daedelus
2016 - Stairs - GASHI
2016 - Enter the Gungeon (Original Soundtrack) - Dose One
2016 - The Feminine: Act I - Anna Wise
2016 - Fool - Jameszoo
2016 - Astral Progressions - Josef Leimberg
2016 - No Reality - Nosaj Thing
2017 - Harmony of Difference - Kamasi Washington
2017 - Drunk - Thundercat
2017 - Brick Body Kids Still Daydream - Open Mike Eagle
2017 - Rap Album Two - Jonwayne
2017 - Mandela Effect - Gonjasufi
2017 - The Feminine: Act II - Anna Wise
2017 - Romaplasm - Baths
2017 - Spangle-Lang Lane - Ryan Porter
2017 - Triumph - Ronald Bruner Jr.
2017 - The Fisherman Abides - The Breathing Effect
2017 - Uprising - Miles Mosley
2018 - Who Told You to Think??!!?!?!?! - Milo
2018 - Aphelion - Ross from Friends
2018 - Heaven and Earth - Kamasi Washington
2018 - Overload - Georgia Anne Muldrow
2018 - Budding Ornithologists Are Weary of Tired Analogies - Milo
2018 - The Optimist - Ryan Porter
2018 - Family Portrait - Ross from Friends
2019 - Flamagra - Flying Lotus
2019 - Force For Good - Ryan Porter
2019 - Encrypted & Vulnerable - Saul Williams
2019 - As If It Were Forever - Anna Wise
2019 - Epiphany - Ross from Friends
2019 - Zdenka 2080 - Salami Rose Joe Louis
2019 - Trust in the Lifeforce of the Deep Mystery - The Comet Is Coming

2020s

2020 - It Is What It Is - Thundercat
2020 - Becoming — Music from the Netflix Original Documentary - Kamasi Washington
2020 - Crazy - Kelly Rowland
2020 - Purple Moonlight Pages - R.A.P. Ferreira
2020 - Anime, Trauma and Divorce - Open Mike Eagle
2020 - Photosynthesis - The Breathing Effect
2020 - Sea Monster - Joey Pecoraro
2020 - The Room - Ricky Reed
2020 - These Days - St. Panther
2020 - Ryan Porter (Live at New Morning, Paris) - Ryan Porter
2021 - bob's son: R.A.P. Ferreira in the garden level cafe of the scallops hotel - R.A.P. Ferreira
2021 - Gold-Diggers Sound - Leon Bridges
2021 - Duets | Golden Gate Bridge - Nate Mercereau
2021 - Under the Lilac Sky - Arushi Jain
2021 - Primordial Waters - Jamael Dean
2021 - Greatness / Places - St. Panther
2021 - the Light Emitting Diamond Cutter Scriptures - R.A.P. Ferreira
2021 - shut the fuck up talking to me - Zack Fox
2021 - When There's Love Around - Kiefer
2021 - To Whom It May Concern... - Freestyle Fellowship
2022 - Ozzy's Dungeon - Flying Lotus
2022 - Component System with the Auto Reverse - Open Mike Eagle
2022 - 5 to the Eye with Stars - R.A.P. Ferreira
2022 - Resilience - Ryan Porter
2022 - SUNDAYS EXPANSION - Nate Mercereau
2022 - Hyper-Dimensional Expansion Beam - The Comet Is Coming

Awards and nominations

References

External links
 
 
 

Living people
1974 births
University of California, San Diego alumni
American hip hop record producers
American hip hop DJs
American audio engineers
Mastering engineers
Musicians from Los Angeles
Narbonne High School alumni